The CFU Youth Cup (sometimes referred to as the Copa Juvenile) was a competition created by the Caribbean Football Union. It began as an exhibition tournament for under-15 age group national teams created by Jack Warner. In 2006, the CFU, led by Warner decided that it should formally become part of the qualifying campaign for the CONCACAF U-17 Championship tournament and thus under-16 age groups played.

Trinidad and Tobago hosted all three editions, the first two finals were played at Hasely Crawford Stadium and the last was played at the Marvin Lee Stadium in Macoya.

References

International association football competitions in the Caribbean
Defunct international association football competitions in North America
2005 establishments in North America
2008 disestablishments in North America
Recurring sporting events established in 2005
Recurring sporting events disestablished in 2008